Sleepy Man (prior to late 2014 known as Sleepy Man Banjo Boys) is a bluegrass music band from Lebanon Township, New Jersey, United States.  It is composed of the Mizzone brothers: Jonny (born 14 March 2002, banjo), Robbie (born 7 November 1998, fiddle and vocals) and Tommy (born 14 July 1997, guitar and background vocals) as well as bass player Josh Thomas.

The group's debut album America's Music, was released in October 2011. Their second CD, The Farthest Horizon, was released in October 2012. In February 2014, they released the single "Run", their first song on which one of them, Robbie, sings. Their third album "By My Side" was released in June 2014 with one instrumental song and five vocal songs.

At the 14th Annual Independent Music Awards in 2015, the Sleepy Man Banjo Boys won awards in the "Instrumental" and "Americana" song categories for "Wildflower" and "Flesh & Bones".

Appearances
On June 28, 2011, the trio appeared on the Late Show with David Letterman and twice on Huckabee talk show. They have played at several bluegrass festivals, the Newport Folk Festival, including one with J.D. Crowe and the New South, and benefits.

The Sleepy Man Banjo Boys made their Grand Ole Opry debut on August 20, 2011. They have also performed at TED conferences in 2012 and 2013.

Discography

Albums

External links 
 
Sleepy Man Banjo Boys Facebook page
Sleepy Man Banjo Boys YouTube page
Sleepy Man Grand Ole Opry bio page

References 

American bluegrass music groups
Musical groups from New Jersey